Exmouth  is a town on the tip of the North West Cape and on Exmouth Gulf in Western Australia,  north of the state capital Perth and  southwest of Darwin as the crow flies.

The town was established in 1967 to support the nearby United States Naval Communication Station Harold E. Holt. It is named after Exmouth Gulf. Beginning in the late 1970s, the town began hosting United States Air Force personnel assigned to Learmonth Solar Observatory, a defence science facility jointly operated with Australia's Ionospheric Prediction Service. The town is served by Learmonth Airport.

History
In 1618, Dutch East India Company ship Mauritius, under command of Willem Janszoon, landed near North West Cape, just proximate to what would be Exmouth, and named Willem's River, which was later renamed Ashburton River.

The location was first used as a military base in World War II. US Admiral James F. Calvert in his memoir, Silent Running: My Years on a World War II Attack Submarine, and US Vice Admiral Charles A. Lockwood in Sink 'Em All, his narrative of Allied submarine warfare, describe its history. After the retreat from Java in March 1942, Allied naval forces had need of a forward base for replenishing submarines, then the sole form of offensive warfare against the Japanese. Both Darwin, Northern Territory, and Broome, Western Australia, were too exposed to air attack, so a 500-ton unmotorized lighter was placed as a refuelling barge near the mouth of Exmouth Gulf, where the Allies were already maintaining a seaplane tender.

Code-named "Potshot", the spartan base was also developed as an submarine advanced base and rest camp using the tender USS Pelias. An airfield (now RAAF Learmonth) was constructed to provide fighter defence for the base. Z Special Unit used Potshot as a staging base for Operation Jaywick, a raid on Japanese shipping in Singapore Harbour, in September 1943.

Tourism

The town relies more on tourism than the station for its existence. At the 2016 census, Exmouth had a population of 2,486. At the height of the tourist season, the population swells to 6,000.

Exmouth is popular for diving and snorkelling. Some of the most famous snorkelling spots include Turquoise Bay and Oysters Stacks.

Yardie Creek and Charles Knife Gorge are land based attractions.

On 20 April 2023, Exmouth will be in the direct path of a total solar eclipse, which will be the first to be visible in Australia since November 2012.

Weather events

On 22 March 1999, Tropical Cyclone Vance reached category 5 status as it made landfall near Exmouth. This resulted in the highest wind gust ever reported on the Australian mainland,  at Learmonth,  to the south. Vance caused significant flooding and property damage. There were no casualties.

In April 2014, Exmouth was hit by a massive flash flood, nearly destroying the caravan park and seriously damaging much of the town's infrastructure, causing a severe blow to tourism in the region.

Climate
Exmouth has a hot semi-arid climate (BSh). There is no specific wet and dry season in Exmouth, although rain is most likely to fall between January and July, usually with monsoonal showers and storms from January to April and from the northern edges of cold fronts in May, June and July. The area occasionally gets caught by tropical cyclones. The period from August to December is usually dry.

References

Further reading

 Western Australia. Ministry for Planning.(1998) Exmouth-Learmonth (North West Cape) structure plan. Perth, W.A. : Western Australian Planning Commission.  (The draft Structure Plan for Exmouth-Learmonth (North West Cape) has been prepared by the Ministry for Planning under the guidance and direction of the Gascoyne Coast Planning Coordinating Committee (GCPCC) and the North West Cape Technical Advisory Group)

External links

Exmouth Shire Information

Shire of Exmouth
Coastal towns in Western Australia